The 1962–63 season was Colchester United's 21st season in their history and their first season back in the third tier of English football following promotion from the Fourth Division the previous season. Alongside competing in the Third Division, the club also participated in the FA Cup and the League Cup. Colchester consolidated their Third Division return by finishing mid-table. In the cups, they bowed out in the first round of the FA Cup to Isthmian League side Wimbledon, while they overcame Watford in the first round of the League Cup only to crash out to Northampton Town in the second.

Season overview
Despite debts of £2,000, the club were not prepared to sell prize forward Bobby Hunt when Newcastle United came in with an offer of £17,000.

During the season, Colchester made their television debut when they featured in the new Anglia Television programme Match of the Week. Highlights were shown on 13 October 1962 of Colchester's Layer Road defeat to Crystal Palace. Martyn King was back on top of the scoring charts for Colchester, leading the way with 26 league goals, Hunt following up with 19. With the defence shipping 93 goals across the season, a mid-table finish loomed for Colchester on their return to the Third Division after just one year away. However, in the FA Cup, they were ousted by Isthmian League Wimbledon in the first round, while they also experienced a second round exit in the League Cup to Northampton Town.

Players

Transfers

In

 Total spending:  ~ £8,750

Out

 Total incoming:  ~ £4,000

Match details

Third Division

Results round by round

League table

Matches

League Cup

FA Cup

Squad statistics

Appearances and goals

|-
!colspan="14"|Players who appeared for Colchester who left during the season

|}

Goalscorers

Clean sheets
Number of games goalkeepers kept a clean sheet.

Player debuts
Players making their first-team Colchester United debut in a fully competitive match.

See also
List of Colchester United F.C. seasons

References

General
Books

Websites

Specific

1962-63
English football clubs 1962–63 season